The discography of American country artist Ashley Monroe consists of five full-length studio albums, two extended plays, nine singles, seven other appearances, and seven music videos. Following the death of her father in 2000, Monroe moved to Nashville, Tennessee as a teenager to pursue a music career. In 2006 and at age nineteen, she signed a contract with Columbia Records. She collaborated with producer Mark Wright on her debut studio album and released an advanced single in 2006 called "Satisfied". The song became a minor hit, only reaching the forty-third position on Billboards Hot Country Songs chart. A second single "I Don't Want To" (a duet with Ronnie Dunn) reached the top forty. Columbia failed to release her album until a top-twenty hit was created from the project. Meanwhile, advanced CD copies were briefly distributed. Monroe was eventually dropped from the label in 2007. However, it was eventually released as a digital download in 2009.

Following the departure, Monroe maintained a low-lying career in the country music industry. In 2007, she collaborated on an EP of songs with Trent Dabbs. In 2008, she was invited by Jack White to participate in recording sessions on his label. She would later collaborate with his band The Raconteurs on the 2008 single "Old Enough". She appeared on pop rock band Train's 2012 single "Bruises", which became a minor country-pop hit. She also wrote material for artists including Jason Aldean and Miranda Lambert during the later half of that decade. Forming a friendship with Lambert, the pair helped found a supergroup titled the Pistol Annies, alongside Angaleena Presley in 2011. Teaming up with artist and producer Vince Gill, her second studio album Like a Rose was issued in March 2013. It debuted at number ten on the Billboard Top Country Albums chart and number forty-three on the Billboard 200 within its first week. The album's third single "Weed Instead of Roses" became a top-forty hit on the Hot Country Songs survey. In 2014 she was featured on Blake Shelton's song "Lonely Tonight", since becoming Monroe's first major top-ten Billboard single. In March 2015, "On to Something Good" was released as the lead single to Monroe's second studio album, The Blade, via Warner Bros. Nashville.

On February 26, 2016, Monroe released a live album containing songs from her previous records and a cover of the Gram Parsons song "Hickory Wind". It was recorded at Third Man Records live before an audience of 200 people on May 12, 2015.

Albums
Studio albums

 Live albums 

 Extended plays 

Singles
As lead artist

 As featured artist 

 Music videos 

 Other appearances 

See also
 Ten Out of Tenn
 Pistol Annies

 Notes 
A^' "I Don't Want To" was only included on the original 2006 version that was sold as an advanced album release.

References

External links
 Ashley Monroe discography overview at Discogs
 Ashley Monroe discography at Rate Your Music

 
 
Country music discographies
Discographies of American artists